Gadney is a surname. Notable people with the surname include:

 Reg Gadney (1941–2018), British painter and thriller writer
 Bernard Gadney (1909–2000), English rugby union footballer

See also
 Gedney (surname)
 Gidney
 Gladney